The Gibson ES-250 was the second edition of the Gibson ES-150 amplified guitar, though released in several different versions. It had 17" body width and a 21" body length.  It had a curly maple back and a spruce top with a maple neck and rosewood fingerboard. It was used in combination with the Gibson EH-185 and EH-275 amplifier.

History

First Version
The first version from 1939 is seen in a popular photograph with Charlie Christian. It had a sunburst finish and a 19 fret fingerboard and stair-stepped headstock and featured "open book" fret markers. It was released for sale that year.

Second Version
The second version can also be seen in photographs of Charlie Christian. It had a natural finish and a twenty fret fingerboard and slight variations on the Charlie Christian pickup, as it has come to be known. It became available by 1940.

Third Variant
What is called the 3rd variant resembled a Gibson L7 with a Charlie Christian pickup.  It had flower pot fret markers and an ornate headstock.  Other variants with differing models of the tailpiece appeared in the short period this guitar was manufactured.

Gallery

References

External links

 Photos and description
  Gibson L7 with Charlie Christian pickup
Pre-war Gibson instruments and amplifiers

ES-250
Semi-acoustic guitars